Ciledug is a district of Tangerang City, Banten, Indonesia.

Ciledug Have Mall named CBD Ciledug

References

Tangerang
Districts of Banten